Elmar Muuk (26 December 1901 – 20 November 1941) was an Estonian linguist and author of a number of dictionaries and textbooks of the Estonian language, and was, together with Johannes Voldemar Veski and Johannes Aavik, responsible for development of Estonian as a modern European language.

Muuk was born in Eivere village, Järva County. He took part of the Estonian War of Independence. Muuk was arrested by NKVD on 14 June 1941 in Tallinn and died in imprisonment in Sevurallag, Sverdlovsk oblast.

Sources 
 Eesti Ekspress 23 August 2007: Mahalaskmine pärast surma by Margit-Mariann Koppel
 Estonian Language Institute: Eesti keele kirjeldamise ja arendamise ajaloost

External links 
 Bibliography at the Library of University of Tartu

1901 births
1941 deaths
People from Paide
People from the Governorate of Estonia
Linguists from Estonia
Estonian military personnel of the Estonian War of Independence
People who died in the Gulag
Estonian people who died in Soviet detention
Nonpersons in the Eastern Bloc
20th-century linguists